Alvin T. Amaral (December 1, 1927 – November 18, 2014) was an American politician. He served as a Republican member of the Hawaii House of Representatives.

Life and career 
Amaral was born in Puʻunene, Hawaii. He was a councilman in Maui.

In 1973, Amaral was elected to the Hawaii House of Representatives, serving until 1976.

Amaral died in November 2014, at the age of 86.

References 

1927 births
2014 deaths
Republican Party members of the Hawaii House of Representatives
20th-century American politicians